The 2021 Hall of Fame Open was a men's tennis tournament played on outdoor grass courts. It was the 45th edition of the event, and part of the 250 series of the 2021 ATP Tour. It took place at the International Tennis Hall of Fame in Newport, Rhode Island, United States, from July 12 through July 18, 2021.

Champions

Singles 

 Kevin Anderson def.  Jenson Brooksby, 7–6(10–8), 6–4

Doubles 

 William Blumberg /  Jack Sock def.  Austin Krajicek /  Vasek Pospisil, 6–2, 7–6(7–3)

Points and prize money

Point distribution

Prize money 

*per team

Singles main draw entrants

Seeds

 1 Rankings are as of June 28, 2021.

Other entrants
The following players received wildcards into the main draw:
  Kevin Anderson
  Ivo Karlović
  Jack Sock

The following players received entry from the qualifying draw:
  Alex Bolt
  Mitchell Krueger
  Sebastian Ofner
  Brayden Schnur

Withdrawals 
Before the tournament
  James Duckworth → replaced by  Jenson Brooksby
  Marcos Giron → replaced by  Jason Jung
  Adrian Mannarino → replaced by  Maxime Cressy
  Mackenzie McDonald → replaced by  Cedrik-Marcel Stebe
  Tommy Paul → replaced by  Jurij Rodionov
  Andreas Seppi → replaced by  Paolo Lorenzi

Doubles main draw entrants

Seeds

1 Rankings are as of June 28, 2021.

Other entrants
The following pairs received wildcards into the doubles main draw:
  William Blumberg /  Jack Sock
  Alexander Bublik /  Dennis Novikov

The following pair received entry as alternates:
  Yoshihito Nishioka /  Yasutaka Uchiyama

Withdrawals
Before the tournament
  Matthew Ebden /  John-Patrick Smith → replaced by  Harri Heliövaara /  John-Patrick Smith
  Harri Heliövaara /  Lloyd Glasspool → replaced by  Robert Galloway /  Alex Lawson
  James Duckworth /  Matt Reid →  Yoshihito Nishioka /  Yasutaka Uchiyama
  Marcos Giron /  Evan King → replaced by  Treat Huey /  Miguel Ángel Reyes Varela
During the tournament
  Alexander Bublik /  Dennis Novikov
  João Sousa /  Jordan Thompson

References

External links 
 

Hall of Fame Open
Hall of Fame Open
Hall of Fame Open
Halloffame
Hall of Fame Open